Hugh Roberts (born September 27, 1992) is an American soccer player who currently plays for Monterey Bay F.C. in the USL Championship.

Youth and college

College
Roberts played college soccer at George Mason University between 2010 and 2013.

While at college, Roberts played for USL PDL club Baltimore Bohemians during their 2012 and 2013 seasons.

Club career

Richmond Kickers
Roberts signed with USL Pro club Richmond Kickers on March 7, 2013. After three seasons with the Kickers, Roberts became a regular starter on the backline making 79 total appearances and scoring twice. During the 2016 season, Roberts was named to the USL All-League First Team.

Bethlehem Steel
Roberts signed with USL club Bethlehem Steel FC on December 22, 2016. Roberts scored his first goal for Bethlehem in April 2017, the winner in a 1-0 home victory over FC Cincinnati.

Pittsburgh Riverhounds
After a single season with Bethlehem Steel, Roberts signed for USL's other Pennsylvania based team, Pittsburgh Riverhounds SC on March 7, 2018.

Charlotte Independence
On January 10, 2019, Roberts joined USL Championship side Charlotte Independence.

Monterey Bay FC
Roberts signed with expansion side Monterey Bay F.C. on February 8, 2022, and was named the team's captain for their inaugural season. Roberts was included in the starting 11 for Monterey Bay's inaugural match, a 4-2 loss to Phoenix Rising FC. His first goal with the club came in the 90th minute in a match away to Oakland Roots. The goal was the game winner for the club's first ever victory in a professional competition.

Honors

Individual
 USL All-League Team: 2016

References

External links
 
 Patriots profile
 
 

1992 births
Living people
American soccer players
Association football defenders
Baltimore Bohemians players
Philadelphia Union II players
Charlotte Independence players
Monterey Bay FC players
George Mason Patriots men's soccer players
People from Gaithersburg, Maryland
People from Olney, Maryland
Pittsburgh Riverhounds SC players
Richmond Kickers players
Soccer players from Maryland
Sportspeople from Montgomery County, Maryland
USL Championship players
USL League Two players